Isabella was a slave ship that brought the first 150 African slaves to the American port of Philadelphia in 1684. The majority of these slaves were purchased directly by Quaker settlers – who themselves had only arrived 3 years earlier to city – to be laborers. 
This would result in approximately 2,500 people of African descent living in the city by the year 1720.

See also 
 Quakers in the Abolition Movement: Even though many Quakers strongly opposed slavery, some Quaker families were slaveholders.
 History of slavery in Pennsylvania

References

Slave ships
First arrivals in the United States